The Outdoor Swimming Society (OSS) is a company that was set up in 2006 by Kate Rew, author of Wild Swim.

The OSS website has information about wild swimming safety and access in the United Kingdom. The OSS aims to encourage people to rediscover the joys of swimming in open, wild water - rivers, lakes, lochs, tarns, ponds, seas.

In 2009, the OSS announced that it was founding a Wild Swimmers' Code, similar in spirit to The Country Code, to encourage safe swimming in wild water. The OSS is engaged in campaigning to keep outdoor lidos and pools open, and to keep seas and rivers clean and swimmable. 
Outdoor Swimming Society members arrange regular meet-ups around the country. Masterclasses with swim coaches are also held round the country.

In 2006/7 the OSS ran the Breaststrokes charity swims in Windermere and the Serpentine, which raised over £150,000 for Cancer Research. The OSS' patrons are Olympic gold medallist Cassie Patten and the author Robert Macfarlane.

References

External links
OSS website
OSS Wild Swimming Map

Swimming organizations
Swimming in the United Kingdom